Monwane is a village in Kweneng District of Botswana. It is located 40 km West-northwest of Molepolole, and it has a primary school. The population was 375 in 2001 census.

References

Kweneng District
Villages in Botswana